Optics Valley Square Station is a station of Line 2 of the Wuhan Metro. It served as the southeastern terminus of the line until February 19, 2019, when the extension of Line 2 to  opened. It entered revenue service on December 28, 2012. It is located in Donghu New Technology Development Zone. It is one of the busiest stations in the Wuhan Metro network serving 210,000 people on May 1, 2014. This station will be the interchange station of Line 2, Line 11 and Line 9.

Station layout

Gallery

References

Wuhan Metro stations
Line 2, Wuhan Metro
Railway stations in China opened in 2012